Colias mukana is a butterfly in the family Pieridae. It is found in the Democratic Republic of Congo (central Shaba) and Malawi.

Subspecies
Colias mukana mukana (Democratic Republic of Congo)
Colias mukana jolyi Verhulst, 2006 (Malawi)

References

Butterflies described in 1981
mukana